John Macarewich Cobin (born 10 March 1963) is a U.S. born blogger, convicted criminal, and social commentator. He renounced his US citizenship in December 2015 and holds a Chilean citizenship. He has taught at various Chilean institutions and was arrested after opening fire at protesters during the Chilean social unrest of 2019 in Reñaca.

Biography 
John Cobin was born to Joan Audrey Cobin née Tagliere (born 1939), a nurse from New York, and George Cobin (1939-1966), a mathematician from Santa Monica, California. His father died from cancer in April 1966.

He studied at various educational institutions including Reformed Bible College, California State University, the University of California, and George Mason University. He holds a Ph.D. in Public Policy, an M.A. in economics, and an A.R.E. in Liberal Arts and Religious Studies.

He left the U.S. to live in Chile first in 1996, in protest of Bill Clinton's government due to its policies regarding taxation. The following year, he became a part-time economics lecturer.

In 2006, he ran for Congress in South Carolina's 4th congressional district as a member of the Libertarian party.  He lost, earning 4,467 votes, or 2.5% of the total count.
During this time period, he was accused of choking, pushing and shoving his second wife multiple times during an argument over the custody of their son, causing her injuries. He denied all accusations, but was ultimately arrested on charges of domestic violence. All of the charges were ultimately dropped. He fled the country shortly thereafter. He subsequently objected to paying either of his former wives child support, and is now estranged from many of his children. In 2012, along with three other Americans, he founded a libertarian compound in the Chilean mountainside, titled "Galt’s Gulch", named in honor of the fictional capitalist society represented in Ayn Rand’s novel, Atlas Shrugged.  The venture ultimately failed.

In 2013, he claimed that "there is no one more neoliberal than me in the country" in an interview with The Clinic. He also claimed that he was friends with Hermógenes Pérez de Arce Ibieta, a right-wing Chilean politician, and Axel Kaiser, a Chilean political scientist.

Until 2015, he was an economics teacher at the Andrés Bello National University. He renounced his US citizenship in December 2015.

On August 22, 2017 his oldest son attended a rally against then-US president Donald Trump. He was arrested after kicking back a tear gas canister towards police officers, after which he was hit in the groin by a pepper ball.  He was later exonerated of all charges.

2019 Reñaca shooting 
On November 10, 2019 he opened fire on Chilean demonstrators in Reñaca, Chile, wounding Luis Jesús Ahumada Villegas, a 33-year old father, in the leg. After this, he recorded a YouTube video, confessing to the crime and claiming that he acted in "self-defense". Due to this, he was convicted of attempted homicide and committing an unjustifiable shooting on public roads. Even though he claimed his actions were based on self-defense, the court rejected his explanation, commenting that "the requirements of legitimate defense are not met". He was sentenced to 11 years of jail time, which was later reduced to 6 years.

In 2020, Publimetro reported that he had tested positive for COVID-19.

Electoral history

References

External links 
 John Cobin's older website
 John Cobin's newer website

1963 births
Chilean people of American descent
Chilean activists
Chilean libertarians
American emigrants to Chile
George Mason University alumni
Living people
2019–2020 Chilean protests
South Carolina politicians convicted of crimes
South Carolina Libertarians